Salgado is a municipality located in the Brazilian state of Sergipe.

References

Municipalities in Sergipe